"6969" is a song written and performed by the American comedy rock band Ninja Sex Party, from their album Attitude City. Heavily inspired by the song "2112" by Canadian rock band Rush, the song contains vocals by Steel Panther singer Michael Starr, and references Steel Panther's song "In the Future" from their album Balls Out.

Written by band members Dan Avidan and Brian Wecht, "6969" tells the story of Danny Sexbang and Ninja Brian travelling to the year 6969 assuming that it will be the ultimate peak in sexual activity throughout human history, only to find out that a totalitarian group known as the "Council of Dick Elders" has made sexual intercourse illegal. At over eight minutes, it was the longest track officially released by Ninja Sex Party until "The Mystic Crystal" in 2019.

Lyrics and interpretation
The song's lyrics follow the fictitious characters of Danny Sexbang and Ninja Brian, who use a time-travelling spacecraft to journey to the planet Earth in the year 6969. Believing that the year would be the ultimate peak in sexual activity throughout human history, they instead find that society is a metaphorically sterilized dystopia ruled by an abstinent, totalitarian group known as the "Dick Elders". When Danny attempts to reason with them, they recall a prophecy that foretells their downfall, and so their guards fire at the duo with lasers. Danny and Brian escape and, after Danny meets a beautiful girl, they ignite a worldwide orgy that enrages the Elders. As the Elders prepare to murder the duo, Brian kills them. Having freed humanity from the Elders' regime, Danny has intercourse once again with the girl he met, whose name is revealed to be Kristen (though Danny mistakes it as "Katie"), and he and Brian depart from the future.

The song directly borrows a lyric from the Rush song "2112", as Sexbang sings the phrase "I know it's most unusual to come before you so".

Music video
The  music video for "6969" was released on iTunes and Apple Music on August 31, 2016, and premiered on YouTube on September 8, 2016.

The video follows the same plot as the song's lyrics, with appearances by Arin Hanson, Barry Kramer, Kevin Abernathy, Holly Conrad, and Ross O'Donovan. Markiplier and Suzy Berhow also make silent cameos in the video as a news reporter and a celebrating person respectively.

Reception
The song has received generally positive reception from both fans of the band and from critics. Richard Garza of the Western Herald wrote that the track is "[Ninja Sex Party's] magnum opus. It is definitely the best song on a great album."

Personnel

Ninja Sex Party
Dan Avidan – vocals
Brian Wecht – keyboards, production

Guests
Michael Starr – guest vocals
Arin Hanson – narrator

Production
 David Dominguez – co-producer, recording
 Dan Castellani, Jr. – mixing
 Hans DeKline – mastering

Level Up version

A re-recorded version of "6969", from their 2021 album Level Up which contains new versions of previously released songs, was released as the album's first single.

Release history

References

2015 songs
2015 singles
Dystopian music
Songs about time travel
Ninja Sex Party songs